WVBH-LP (105.3 FM) is a radio station licensed to Benton Harbor, Michigan, United States. The station is currently owned by Flats Economic Development Corp.

References

External links
 

VBH-LP
VBH-LP
Radio stations established in 2004
2004 establishments in Michigan
Benton Harbor, Michigan